Le Pleureur (3,704 m) is a mountain of the Pennine Alps. It is located in Valais, between Lac de Mauvoisin and Lac des Dix.

See also
List of mountains of Switzerland

References

External links
Le Pleureur on Hikr

Alpine three-thousanders
Pennine Alps
Mountains of Valais
Mountains of the Alps
Mountains of Switzerland